Triple Mania II is the final full-length album from Crash Worship, released on October 25, 1994 by Charnel Music. Originally released in elaborately folded chipboard packaging and screen printed copper covers. Re-released in clear jewel cases and printed transparency inserts.

Reception

Dawn Sutter writing for the CMJ New Music Report gave the album a positive review, saying "Crash Worship has an edge, both inside and out... from the packaging to the last track, there is an exciting unpredictability."

Track listing
"Wild Mountain" – 3:15
"Pyru" – 5:05
"Phuchi" – 5:03
"Muscolos" – 4:48
"TCB" – 4:00
"Triple Mania I – 3:39
"Night Shoe" – 4:29
"Vitamin K" – 2:40
"Bring Me the Head of Jeff Mattson" – 3:23
"Git on Home" - 4:25
"Live NYC '92" - 11:56

References

1994 albums
Charnel Music albums